Louis Levacher (15 August 1934, Fécamp – 7 March 1983, Harfleur) was a French painter and sculptor.

Lineage 

The Levacher family is first mentioned in Contremoulins archives circa the late 18th century and appears to originate from the Valmont region.  The older branch of the family moved to Montivilliers while the younger branch moved to Criquebeuf-en-Caux, Yport, Saint-Valery-en Caux, and finally to Fécamp. Members of this younger branch made their living as millers, then farmers, eventually becoming rope makers. Under the French Restoration, the Levachers of Fécamp gradually became merchants and ship-owners, ascending into the local petite bourgeoisie and enjoying a quick rise in social status. The family, however, would only hold this position for a little less than a century.

Louis Levacher's grandfather, a ship-owner and merchant, was also named Louis (1877–1949). He was awarded the cross of Verdun and subsequently handed over his business management to his wife, Marguerite Grivel. His son, Louis' father, also named Louis (1911–1988), owned a smokehouse. The buildings still partly belong to the family. Louis' mother, Denise Thomas (1913–2003), was a seamstress from a Doudeville family that dates back to the 17th century.

Early life and background 

Louis (1934–1983) was an only child and was born five years before the start of the Second World War. His parents divorced during the war. While his grandfather's endeavours continued in spite of the war, those of his father were hampered by his deployment in 1940.

Louis married Michèle Moreau (1942–2012) and soon after his marriage, Louis had to leave for Algeria.

Louis and Michèle had three children, two sons and a daughter. The eldest son was named Louis, continuing the family tradition.

Louis Levacher worked as a driver, as well as a painter and sculptor. He is famous for his artistic work. Art was very much a family endeavor for the Levacher's. Louis and his wife Michèle worked together, creating pieces with a highly original, avant-garde style. Michèle exhibited her work in various places, including the Basque country. While well-recognized both in Normandy and beyond, their art did not make them rich. His daughter also specialized in collage and sculpture, exhibiting her work in the region several times.

Style and technique 

Levacher used multiple techniques in his art, including painting and sculpture. His paintings, mixed figurative and abstract, often using large formats. His sculptures mix genres, with wood being used to represent saints or being formed into richly detailed totems.

Exhibitions in France

Exhibitions abroad 

 Show Mouscron, Belgium
 Royal Windsor Gallery, Brussels
 University of Heidelberg, Germany
 "Research and Expression" exhibition, the United States and Japan
 Assessment of Contemporary Art, Quebec
 Zoetermeer, Netherlands

Sources 

 Documentation belonging to the family Levacher.
 Documentation belonging to the family Grivel
 
 Municipal Archives and Contremoulins Fécamp

References 

20th-century French painters
20th-century French male artists
French male painters
1934 births
1983 deaths
20th-century French sculptors
French male sculptors
People from Fécamp